Selfridge Public School is a public elementary school and high school located in Selfridge, North Dakota. The athletic teams are known as the "Chieftains" and "Warriors".

District
Selfridge Public School District is a school district of the publicly funded school serving the town of Selfridge and the surrounding rural areas. District administration offices are in Selfridge. It has the largest land area of any other school district in Sioux County.

Athletics
Basketball (boys and girls)
Football1
Track and Field (boys and girls)1
Volleyball1
Wrestling1
Cross Country1
Golf1
1: This sport is joined with Standing Rock Community Grant High School.

Classes Offered
Algebra
Algebra II
Geometry
Consumer Math
Life Science
Earth Science
Physical Science
Biology
Chemistry
Physics
ND History
World History
U.S. History
Archaeology
Citizenship
Problems Of Democracy
Women: Past and Present
General Music
Health
Physical Education
Family Living
Spanish
Art
Consumer Education
Personal Finance
Lakota Language
Online A+ Classes
MREC Classes

Extracurricular activities
Student Council

References

External links
Selfridge Public School, NDHAA
Selfridge Schools

School districts in North Dakota
Public high schools in North Dakota
Public middle schools in North Dakota
Public elementary schools in North Dakota
North Dakota High School Activities Association (Class B)
Schools in Sioux County, North Dakota
School districts established in 1910
Educational institutions established in 1910
1910 establishments in North Dakota